is a railway station on the Toei Mita Line in Itabashi, Tokyo, Japan, operated by Toei Subway.

Lines
Hasune Station is served by the Toei Mita Line, and is numbered "I-23".

Platforms
The station consists of an elevated island platform.

See also
 List of railway stations in Japan

External links

 Toei station information 

Railway stations in Tokyo
Railway stations in Japan opened in 1968
Toei Mita Line